Probatostola is a genus of moths belonging to the family Tineidae. It contains only one species, Probatostola ochromalla, which is found in Namibia.

References

Endemic fauna of Namibia
Myrmecozelinae
Monotypic moth genera
Lepidoptera of Namibia
Moths of Africa